The 1987–88 season of the European Cup Winners' Cup finished with a shock victory by Mechelen in the final against defending champions Ajax. This led to their 1988 European Super Cup title in the club's first ever European campaign (1987–89). As the next season's Belgian league victor it defended its title in a semifinal of the 1988–89 European Cup Winners' Cup. Financial problems have been keeping this last Belgian holder of any European cup away from a position to be as successful again.

Preliminary round 

|}

First leg

Second leg

Dunajská Streda won 6–1 on aggregate.

First round 

|}

First leg

Second leg

1–1 on aggregate. RoPS won on away goals

Vllaznia won 6–0 on aggregate.

Mechelen won 3–0 on aggregate.

St Mirren won 1–0 on aggregate.

Real Sociedad won 2–0 on aggregate.

Dinamo Minsk won 4–1 on aggregate.

OFI Crete won 3–2 on aggregate.

Atalanta won 3–2 on aggregate.

Kalmar FF won 1–0 on aggregate.

Sporting CP won 6–4 on aggregate.

Marseille won 1–0 on aggregate.

1–1 on aggregate. Hajduk Split won 4–2 on penalties.

Den Haag won 3–2 on aggregate.

Young Boys won 4–3 on aggregate.

Hamburg won 8–0 on aggregate.

Ajax won 6–0 on aggregate.

Second round 

|}
Notes
Note 1: With Hajduk Split winning 2–0, the match was interrupted for 15 minutes due to tear gas being thrown onto the stands The match was voided and awarded 3–0 to Marseille due to the crowd trouble.

First leg

Second leg

Mechelen won 2–0 on aggregate.

Sporting CP won 5–1 on aggregate.

RoPS won 2–0 on aggregate.

2–2 on aggregate. Young Boys won on away goals.

Ajax won 3–0 on aggregate.

1–1 on aggregate. Dinamo Minsk won on away goals.

Atalanta won 2–1 on aggregate.

The match was interrupted in the 10th minute with the score 0–0 due to tear gas being thrown in the stands by Hajduk fans. The resulting commotion was accompanied with the same fans throwing flares onto the pitch followed by a pitch invasion. The match was resumed some 15 minutes later and completed with Hajduk winning 2–0 on the night and Marseille advancing 4–2 on aggregate. At a disciplinary hearing several days later, UEFA voided the match due to the crowd trouble, awarding a 3–0 win to Marseille and banning Hajduk from European competition for two seasons.Marseille won 7–0 on aggregate.

Quarter-finals 

|}

First leg

Second leg

Mechelen won 2–1 on aggregate.

Atalanta won 3–1 on aggregate.

Marseille won 4–0 on aggregate.

Ajax won 2–0 on aggregate.

Semi-finals 

|}

First leg

Second leg

Mechelen won 4–2 on aggregate.

Ajax won 4–2 on aggregate.

Final

Top scorers
The top scorers from the 1987–88 UEFA Cup Winners' Cup are as follows:

External links 
 1987-88 competition at UEFA website
 Cup Winners' Cup results at Rec.Sport.Soccer Statistics Foundation

3
UEFA Cup Winners' Cup seasons